Karool-Tebe is a village in Naryn Region of Kyrgyzstan.

References

Populated places in Naryn Region